A film series or movie series (also referred to as a film franchise or movie franchise)  is a collection of related films in succession that share the same fictional universe, or are marketed as a series.

This article explains what film series are and gives brief examples of movie series. The body shows a list of the most popular film series and franchises in the United States and Canada.

Description
Sometimes the work is conceived from the beginning as a multiple-film work—for example, the Three Colours series—but in most cases the success of the original film (or an original series in the case of the Skywalker Saga) inspires further films to be made. Individual sequels are relatively common but are not always successful enough to spawn further installments.

As of 2022, the 30 films of the Marvel Cinematic Universe form the highest-grossing film series even when adjusted for inflation, surpassing J. K. Rowling's Wizarding World (11 films), Star Wars (12 films), Ian Fleming's James Bond (27 films), and J. R. R. Tolkien's Middle-earth (6 films) series.

Box office

Longest-running film series and franchises

See also
 Lists of feature film series
 Highest-grossing franchises and film series
 Media franchise
 List of highest-grossing media franchises
 List of longest-running video game franchises

References

Works cited

 
 
 

 
Filmmaking